This is a summary of the season results in the Bayer 04 Leverkusen football club from 1946 to the present.

Key

Key to league record:
Pld – Matches played
W – Matches won
D – Matches drawn
L – Matches lost
GF – Goals for
GA – Goals against
Pts – Points
Pos – Final position

Key to rounds:
Prel. – Preliminary round
QR1 – First qualifying round
QR2 – Second qualifying round, etc.
Inter – Intermediate round (between qualifying rounds and rounds proper)
GS – Group stage
1R – First round
2R – Second round, etc.
R64 – 1/32 Final (round of 64)
R32 – 1/16 Final (round of 32)
R16 – 1/8 Final (round of 16)
QF – Quarter-finals
SF – Semi-finals
F – Final
W – Winners
DNE – Did not enter

Seasons

References

Bayer 04 Leverkusen
Leverkusen, Bayer
German football club statistics